Ealdorman was a term in Anglo-Saxon England which originally applied to a man of high status, including some of royal birth, whose authority was independent of the king. It evolved in meaning and in the eighth century was sometimes applied to the former kings of territories which had submitted to great powers such as Mercia. In Wessex in the second half of the ninth century it meant the leaders of individual shires appointed by the king. By the tenth century ealdormen had become the local representatives of the West Saxon king of England. Ealdormen would lead in battle, preside over courts and levy taxation. Ealdormanries were the most prestigious royal appointments, the possession of noble families and semi-independent rulers. Their territories became large, often covering  former kingdoms such as Mercia or East Anglia. Southern ealdormen often attended court, reflecting increasing centralisation of the kingdom, but the loyalty of northern ealdormen was more uncertain. In the eleventh century the term eorl, today's earl, replaced that of ealdorman, but this reflected a change in terminology under Danish influence rather than a change in function.

Aldermen
Although earls may be regarded as the successors of ealdormen, the word ealdorman itself did not disappear and survives in modern times as alderman in many jurisdictions founded upon English law. This term, however, developed distinctly different meanings which have little to do with ealdormen, who ruled shires or larger areas, while aldermen are members of a municipal assembly or council, such as the City Council of Chicago and the City of Adelaide.

Similar titles also exist in some Germanic countries, such as the Swedish Ålderman, the Danish Oldermand and West Frisian Olderman, the Dutch Ouderman, the (non-Germanic) Finnish Oltermanni (a borrowing from the neighboring Germanic Swedes) and the German Ältester, which all mean "elder man" or "wise man".

See also
 Starosta, the Slavic equivalent of ealdorman
 Earls, ealdormen and high-reeves of Bamburgh
 Æthelmund, Ealdorman of the Hwicce
 Ælfhere, ealdorman of Mercia (d. 983)
 Ælfhelm, ealdorman of southern Northumbria (d. c. 1006)
 Ælfric, ealdorman of Hampshire
 Æthelweard the Chronicler
 Byrhtnoth, ealdorman of Essex (d. 991)
 Eadric Streona, ealdorman of the Mercians (d. 1017)
 Odda, Ealdorman of Devon (fl. 878)
 Wulfhere, Ealdorman of Wiltshire (fl.  c. 855–877)
 Wulfstan, ealdorman of Wiltshire (d. 802)

References

Sources

Further reading
Banton, N., "Ealdormen and Earls in England from the Reign of King Alfred to the Reign of King Æthelred II", D.Phil. thesis, University of Oxford, 1981
Loyn, Henry R. "The term ealdorman in the translations prepared at the time of King Alfred." English Historical Review 68 (1953): 513–25.
Stenton, Sir Frank M. Anglo-Saxon England; 3rd ed. London: Oxford University Press, 1971.
Williams, Ann. Kingship and Government in Pre-Conquest England, c. 500–1066. Basingstoke: Macmillan, 1999  

 
Anglo-Saxon society